Kindra State Forest is a native forest, in the Australian state of New South Wales with a total area of about 520 hectares.
It is located at Coolamon, New South Wales.

References

External links

New South Wales state forests
Riverina